Te Atatū may refer to:
Te Atatū Peninsula, a suburb of Auckland
Te Atatū South, a suburb of Auckland
Te Atatū (New Zealand electorate), a parliamentary electorate in West Auckland